Glacial Lakes State Park is a state park of Minnesota, USA, approximately  south of Starbuck. It was founded in 1963 to preserve some of the remaining rolling prairie which previously covered much of the state. Located in the Leaf Mountains, the park and the area around it contains many glacial landforms created by the Wisconsonian glaciation.

Biology and ecology

Flora
The park has many rare native plants. Prairie grasses and forbs that may be seen include big bluestem, little bluestem, Indian grass, prairie clover, pasque flowers, coneflowers and goldenrods. Wolfberry and rose shrubs are also in the park.

Fauna
Due to its location in a transition zone between prairie in the west and hardwood forest to the east, prairie and woodland birds are found at the park. Squirrels, deer, beavers, wood ducks, raccoons, pileated woodpeckers and occasionally coyotes can be found.

Recreation
Swimming, fishing and boating (only electric motors are allowed) are popular activities. At 56-acres, Signalness Lake is the largest body of water in the park and has a maximum depth of 13 ft. Fish include walleye, northern pike, bass, and panfish. Due to the shallow water, winterkill can partially affect the fish population and the DNR restocks fish.

Snowshoeing, cross-country skiing, and snowmobiling are enjoyed during the winter.

The remote location with low light pollution means stargazing is another popular activity.

References

External links

 Glacial Lakes State Park
 "Minnesota Conservation Volunteer" snapshot of the park

1963 establishments in Minnesota
Protected areas established in 1963
Protected areas of Pope County, Minnesota
State parks of Minnesota